The Jacksonville Transportation Authority (JTA) is the independent agency responsible for public transit in the city of Jacksonville, Florida, and roadway infrastructure that connects northeast Florida. However, they do not maintain any roadways.

History 
In 1955, the Florida Legislature established the Jacksonville Expressway Authority. Its responsibility was limited to highways, bridges and tolls in Duval County until 1971, when the Jacksonville Transportation Authority was formed by a merger of the Jacksonville Expressway Authority with several private bus companies.

Governance 
The JTA is governed by a seven-member Board of Directors. The mayor of Jacksonville appoints three members who must be confirmed by the Jacksonville City Council; the Florida Governor appoints three members who must be confirmed by the Florida Senate. Each member serves a four-year, unpaid term and can be re-appointed for a second term. If a member serves eight consecutive years, they must rotate off the board. From its membership, the Board elects its own Chairman, Vice Chairman, Secretary and Treasurer for one year terms. The seventh member is the District Two Secretary from the Florida Department of Transportation (FDOT) who serves as long as s/he is employed in the position. That individual is responsible for the FDOT activities within the 18 counties of the district, including administrative, planning and operations.

As of September 2022, members included Ari Jolly, chair; Debbie Buckland, vice chair; G. Ray Driver, secretary; Abel Harding, treasurer; Greg Evans, FDOT District Two Secretary; Kevin Holzendorf, board member; and Aundra Wallace, board member.

Revenue 
Originally, when a bridge or roadway was completed, a toll was imposed at that location to create a revenue stream to repay bonds used to fund construction. State and federal tax money was used for specific capital projects, such as interstate highways.

Gas surcharge 
The Jacksonville City Council approved a 10-year, 6¢ per gallon gasoline surcharge in 1986 to pay for new roadways and other transportation projects. Prior to its expiration in 1996, the council extended the tax for 20 additional years, until 2016. In 2021, the City Council approved a further extension and increase to 12¢ per gallon in order to pay for infrastructure projects including the Emerald Trail system and the Ultimate Urban Circulator project to convert the Skyway monorail into an autonomous vehicle network.

Tolls 
J. Turner Butler Boulevard, the Fuller Warren Bridge, Mathews Bridge, Hart Bridge, and Trout River Bridge were tolled by JTA until 1988, when Jacksonville voters approved a ½¢ sales tax increase to pay off the toll bonds, fund future road construction, and abolish toll collections.

Growth management 
JTA was the major beneficiary of the $2.25 billion Better Jacksonville Plan (BJP), passed by voters in September, 2000. Roadway/drainage improvements, resurfacing, new sidewalks and railroad grade crossings accounted for $1.5 billion, of which half was funded by the BJP ½¢ sales tax increase and half from the existing gasoline surcharge. In 2005, the JTA and city re-prioritized the projects still outstanding. The actual cost for most projects had significantly exceeded the estimate due to an 18-month lag time and an unanticipated increase in the price of construction materials. Dozens of projects were deferred to the future and removed from the BJP or left on a $320 million list of unfunded tasks.

Budget 
The gasoline surcharge generates approximately $30 million in revenue each year, about one third of JTA's budget of $100 million in 2010. Prior to the 1986 gasoline surcharge, tolls were the primary source of local revenue for the JTA. Federal and state highway money provided the balance. In early June, 2010, JTA announced their intentions to request an extension of the 6¢ per gallon gasoline surcharge, due to expire in 2016. They will also ask the council for an additional 5¢ per gallon tax over 30 years that would generate another $25 million per year, for a total of $55 million each year. Most council members questioned the need to extend the existing tax and were opposed to any new tax during difficult economic times, but JTA executives warned that if the gas taxes are curtailed, no road construction will occur and bus service will be slashed.

Responsibilities 
The mission of the JTA is to improve Northeast Florida’s economy, environment and quality of life by providing safe, reliable, efficient and sustainable multimodal transportation services and facilities.

Roadway infrastructure 
The JTA develops and implements construction and financing plans for state and city roads, bridges and interchanges in conjunction with the city government and the Florida Department of Transportation. This was the original role of the Expressway Authority.

Public transit 
 Regular bus service: JTA's fleet has 220 vehicles, as of 2015, that travel 8.5 million miles per year on 56 routes; 110 maintenance workers and 320 drivers are employed.
 Express bus service: five once-daily early morning routes are offered which originate from an outlying area and go directly to their destination with no intermediate stops, then return in late afternoon.
 First Coast Flyer: a bus rapid transit (BRT) system; all four planned routes are now in operation.
 Trolley-replica buses: local transportation available weekdays from mid-morning to early afternoon; Bay Street and Beaver Street (downtown) routes are free; Riverside and the Beach trolley have a minimal charge but also run on weekends.
 JTA Connexion: paratransit for the disabled and elderly, provided by private vendors with specially equipped vehicles and drivers.
 Stadium shuttle: game day bus transportation from suburban, downtown and Park-n-Ride locations to the stadium and back.
 Jacksonville Skyway: Automated people mover system which travels 2.5 miles from the King Street parking garage across the St. Johns River and through the central business district, ending at LaVilla or the Florida State College at Jacksonville downtown campus.
 Park-n-Ride: Parking facility available in combination with express bus service or JTA Skyway.
 Jacksonville Regional Transportation Center (JRTC): JTA opened a new intermodal transit center in May, 2020, bringing together Jacksonville Skyway, JTA bus, First Coast Flyer, intercity bus, and rail service in one facility. JRTC replaced the aging and overcrowded Rosa Parks Transit Station. JRTC is situated across the street from the Prime F. Osborn III Convention Center.

Future transit 
 First Coast Commuter Rail: JTA is undertaking evaluations for a future commuter rail system.
 Ultimate Urban Circulator (U2C): JTA is undertaking a project to modernize and replace the Jacksonville Skyway by converting and expanding the automated people mover into an autonomous vehicle (AV) network.

Hurricanes 
The JTA has the responsibility to identify, plan and prepare Jacksonville's hurricane evacuation routes. The JTA and the city of Jacksonville established a Hurricane Preparedness Plan that will provide emergency evacuation/patient transport and move civilians and/or emergency service personnel with mass transit.

Routes 

On December 1, 2014, JTA underwent a complete system redesign called Route Optimization. This was to provide more frequent, more direct, and more reliable service. The current routes as follows.

Local Bus Routes 
1 North Main
2 Lem Turner
3 Moncrief
4 Kings
8 Beach / Town Center
10 Atlantic
11 A. Philip Randolph
12 Myrtle / Lem Turner
13 Commonwealth / Lane
14 Edison / Normandy
16 Riverside / Wilson
17 St. Augustine
18 Atlantic / Monument
19 Arlington
21 Boulevard/ Gateway
22 Avenue B
23 Townsend / Southside
24 Mayport
25 San Jose
26 Collins (service west of Rampart Road replaced by ReadiRide Oakleaf on December 2, 2019)
27 Philips / Avenues
28 Southside / Sunbeam
30 Cecil / Blanding (renamed from 30 Cecil on December 5, 2016; sections replaced by ReadiRide Southwest on December 3, 2018)
31 FSCJ Kent Campus/Argyle Village
32 McDuff
33 Spring Park / Philips
50 University
51 Edgewood
53 Commonwealth / Cassat
80 NAS Shuttle
81 Dinsmore Shuttle
82 Armsdale / Duval
84 Philips / Gran Bay
85 Highlands / Busch Drive
86 Northside
102 First Coast Flyer Green
105 First Coast Flyer Orange
107 First Coast Flyer Blue
109 First Coast Flyer Red
500 St Johns River Ferry

Trolleys 
71 Riverside/Avondale Night Trolley (only runs the first full weekend of the month, on Friday and Saturday from 6pm until 2am)

Express Routes 
200 Mandarin Express
201 Clay Regional Express
202 Mayport Express
205 Beaches Express

Former Routes 
2 Lem Turner (converted to First Coast Flyer and renamed route 102 First Coast Flyer Green on December 7, 2015; local stops served by extended route 12 and new route 21)
7 Philips (converted to First Coast Flyer and renamed route 107 First Coast Flyer Blue on December 5, 2016; local stops served by new route 27)
9 Arlington / Beach (converted to First Coast Flyer and renamed route 109 First Coast Flyer Red on December 3, 2018; local stops served by routes 8, 10, and new Coastal Cab Southside service, which was replaced by ReadiRide Southside on July 1, 2019)
31 Talleyrand (Replaced by ReadiRide Talleyrand on December 2, 2019)
34 Blanding / Edgewood (mostly merged into route 30 on December 5, 2016; rest discontinued)
35 Sunbeam / Baymeadows (combined with part of route 23 to form new route 28 Southside / Sunbeam on December 3, 2018)
70 Beaches Trolley (Discontinued in September 2016; only ran from May-September each year; replaced by Beachside Buggies service)
83 Soutel / Pritchard (Replaced by ReadiRide Pritchard on December 2, 2019)
203 NAS Shuttle (renumbered route 80 on December 5, 2016)
204 Dinsmore Shuttle (renumbered route 81 on December 5, 2016)
300 Dunn / Pritchard Community Shuttle (replaced by new route 83 Soutel / Pritchard on December 3, 2018; rest covered by route 81)
301 Oakleaf Community Shuttle (replaced by new route 26 Collins on December 3, 2018)
302 Southeast Community Shuttle (replaced by new route 84 Philips / Gran Bay and new ReadiRide Southeast  on December 3, 2018)
303 Beaches Community Shuttle (replaced by ReadiRide Beaches on December 3, 2018)
304 Mandarin Community Shuttle (discontinued on December 3, 2016 due to low ridership; restored on May 8, 2017 as Coastal Cab service; this service was replaced by ReadiRide Mandarin on July 1, 2019)
305 Highlands Community Shuttle (replaced by new route 85 Highlands / Busch Drive and new ReadiRide Highlands on December 3, 2018)
306 Heckscher Community Shuttle (merged into route 305 in August 2015)
307 Northside Community Shuttle (replaced by new route 86 Northside and new ReadiRide Northside on December 3, 2018)
308 Arlington Community Shuttle (replaced by Coastal Cab service on December 3, 2018; this service was replaced by ReadiRide Arlington July 1, 2019)

First Coast Commuter Rail 

First Coast Commuter Rail is a proposed commuter rail system serving Jacksonville, FL and northeast Florida. It is currently in the planning stages, having completed the first step of a feasibility study and currently pursuing an alternatives analysis.

Three routes were analyzed in depth, north to Yulee, FL, southwest to Green Cove Springs, FL and the southeast to St. Augustine, FL.

A feasibility study was completed in November 2009 for the Jacksonville Transportation Authority (JTA). James Boyle, JTA's regional transportation planner, has since said that there are no fatal flaws in the study.

JTA hired a consultant to conduct a feasibility study in early 2008 at the cost of $400,000. It was completed in November 2009. The study looked into 7 routes, most along existing freight rail right of ways. Three of these, north to Yulee, FL, southwest to Green Cove Springs, FL and the southeast to St. Augustine, FL were selected for in depth study. In the Summer of 2010, JTA allocated $1 Million for an Alternative Analysis study on the proposed system. This is a required step to participate in the Federal Transit Administration's (FTA) New Starts program.

In May 2013, St. Augustine City Commission voted in a resolution supporting the proposal of a commuter train service on the southeast corridor. JTA says that the federal government could fund half of the southeast corridor project, estimated to cost about $193.3 million. The proposal still needs approval from St. Johns County, The North Florida Transportation Planning Organization board, and the Jacksonville Transportation Authority board.

As of 2018, First Coast Commuter Rail is still in the planning stages and no funding has been identified for its implementation.

All routes in the in-depth study start in downtown Jacksonville and head out in one of three directions: North (to Yulee), South (to Green Cove Springs), and Southeast (to St. Augustine).

The North Corridor originates in Downtown Jacksonville, and heads North along the abandoned S-Line to the CSX Kingsland division line to Yulee, FL.  The Kingsland division line is a remnant of the Seaboard Air Line's mainline.  The route passes two miles (3 km) from Jacksonville International Airport.

The Southwest Corridor originates in Downtown Jacksonville, and heads South along the CSX A-Line to Green Cove Springs, FL.

The Southeast Corridor originates in Downtown Jacksonville, and heads Southeast along the Florida East Coast Railway's main line to St. Augustine, closely following U.S. 1, known as Philips Highway in Jacksonville and Ponce de Leon Boulevard in St. Augustine . The proposed  route would share the railbed with the northernmost part of a  freight rail line to Miami.  The heavily trafficked corridor already serves 17 regularly scheduled interregional freight trains per day, a figure which does not include Amtrak service, unscheduled freight trains, and other services. The 2009 feasibility study estimated that this route could carry an estimated 5,469 passengers in 2020 on trains between Jacksonville and St. Augustine. Travel time is estimated at 51 minutes end to end, comparable to travel time by car.  Notable proposed stops along the route include the J. Turner Butler Freeway, The Avenues, Race Track Road/Nocatee, the massive mixed-use residential/commercial development at Palencia, West St. Augustine, the Northeast Florida Regional Airport (not to be confused with the much larger and busier Jacksonville International Airport almost 50 miles to the north), the St. Johns County Government Complex, and its terminus in Downtown St. Augustine.

References

External links 
Official website
FDOT District 2

Toll road authorities of the United States
Government of Jacksonville, Florida
Transportation in Jacksonville, Florida
Special districts of Florida
1971 establishments in Florida